St Austell Bay is a bay on Cornwall's south coast which is bounded to the east by Gribbin Head and to the west by Black Head.

It lies southeast of the town of St Austell and stretches along the coast from Charlestown in the north to Black Head in the south. It includes the communities of Charlestown, Duporth, Porthpean (Higher and Lower Porthpean) and Trenarren and is represented by seven councillors.

References

External links

Civil parishes in Cornwall
Beaches of Cornwall
Populated coastal places in Cornwall